Terence Mondon is a member of the National Assembly of Seychelles.  He is a member of the Seychelles People's Progressive Front, and was first elected to the Assembly in 2002.

See also
Politics of Seychelles

References

External links
Member page on Assembly website

Year of birth missing (living people)
Living people
Members of the National Assembly (Seychelles)
People from Takamaka, Seychelles
United Seychelles Party politicians